Archibald I. Lawrence (1869–1950), usually referred to as A. I. Lawrence, was an American architect who practiced in Berlin, New Hampshire, and Burlington, Vermont.

Life and career
After studying at the Massachusetts Normal Art School in Boston, Lawrence moved to Berlin in 1892. He began his professional career soon after, when he formed a partnership with L. U. Cole. This lasted until 1894, when he opened his own office. After 10 years, he formed a partnership with his draftsman, Howland C. Bates, Lawrence & Bates. Bates opened his own office soon after, and would design Berlin's City Hall. Lawrence remained in Berlin until 1907, when he moved west to Vermont, settling in Burlington. There he took the place of Walter R. B. Willcox, who had moved to Seattle. In 1919 he moved to Isle La Motte, where he focused on industrial design. Eventually, he returned to Burlington, keeping an office there until 1932.

Legacy
Two buildings of Lawrence's design have been individually listed on the National Register of Historic Places, and two more in the downtowns of Concord, New Hampshire, and Barre, Vermont, contribute to listed historic districts.

Architectural works
 1897 - Wertheim Building, 171 Main St, Berlin, New Hampshire
 1898 - Brook Street School, 45 Brook St, Barre, Vermont
 1900 - St. Anne R. C. Church, 58 Church St, Berlin, New Hampshire
 1901 - Wonolancet Club, 40 Pleasant St, Concord, New Hampshire
 1903 - Berlin Public Library, 270 Main St, Berlin, New Hampshire
 A Carnegie building
 1903 - Goudie Block, 21 S Main St, Lisbon, New Hampshire
 1904 - City National Bank Building, 27 Green Sq, Berlin, New Hampshire
 1904 - L. J. Cote Block, 73 Main St, Berlin, New Hampshire
 1904 - Lisbon Town Hall, 46 School St, Lisbon, New Hampshire
 1905 - Berlin High School (former), 138 Hillside Ave, Berlin, New Hampshire
 Burned.
 1905 - Burgess School (former), 411 School St, Berlin, New Hampshire
 1907 - Edward J. Booth House, 438 College St, Burlington, Vermont
 1907 - Brightlook Hospital, 91 Brightlook Dr, St. Johnsbury, Vermont
 1912 - Jackson Building, 100 N Main St, Barre, Vermont
 1916 - Dormitories, Vermont State School, Brandon, Vermont

References

1869 births
1950 deaths
19th-century American architects
Architects from Vermont
Architects from New Hampshire
People from Berlin, New Hampshire
People from Burlington, Vermont
20th-century American architects